Psychotria expansa is a West Sumatran rainforest understory shrub from the family Rubiaceae.

References

Flora of Sumatra
expansa